NGC 1132 is an elliptical galaxy located in the constellation Eridanus. The galaxy was discovered by John Herschel on November 23, 1827. It is located at a distance of about 318 million light-years away from Earth. 

NGC 1132 and nearby small galaxies are known as a "fossil group" that resulted from the merger of a group of galaxies. It is notable for being the prototype example of the class of fossil galaxy groups. The identification as a fossil group was made in 1999. This group contains an enormous amount of dark matter and a large amount of hot gas that emits X-ray radiation. The galaxy is surrounded by thousands of globular star clusters.

References

See also 

1132
02359
010891
Elliptical galaxies
Eridanus (constellation)